Rhinoceros ( ポルノグラフィティ)  is the tenth studio album by Japanese pop-rock band Porno Graffitti (ポルノグラフィティ.) It was released on August 19, 2015. The album features the song "Oh! Rival," the theme song to the anime "Detective Conan: Sunflowers of Fire," the 19th movie in the Detective Conan franchise.

Track listing

References

External links
 

2015 albums
Porno Graffitti albums
Japanese-language albums
Sony Music albums